MSDAIPP (Microsoft Data Access Internet Publishing Provider) is a component of Microsoft Windows that can be used to enumerate or access Internet resources within an application that uses ActiveX Data Objects or OLEDB.

The component was developed in 1998. The codename of the project was 'Rosebud'. It is a 32-bit component and Microsoft have no plans for a 64-bit version, considering it deprecated.

Microsoft products that make extensive use of MSDAIPP include Microsoft Office
, Exchange Server
, Windows SharePoint Services and SharePoint Server.

Versions

There have been many versions of the component. The major version numbers are:

 8.xxx.xxxx.x - as came with Windows 2000, Windows ME and Office 2000
 10.xxx.xxxx.x - as came with SharePoint Portal Server 2001 and Windows XP
 11.xxx.xxxx.x - as came with SharePoint Portal Server 2003, Office 2003 and Windows Server 2003
 12.xxx.xxxx.x - as came with Office 2007
 14.x.xxxx.xxxx - as came with Office 2010

Server Support

Servers supported by the component include:

 FrontPage Server Extensions (FPSE)
 Web Extender Client (WEC)
 Web Distributed Authoring and Versioning (WebDAV or HTTP-DAV) protocol extension for HTTP

Known issues
There are many components involved in a properly functioning installation of MSDAIPP and occasionally the components become unregistered or corrupted.

References

External links
 Web Folder Client (MSDAIPP.DLL) Versions and Issues List

Component-based software engineering